Sporomusa termitida is a species of bacteria. It is an acetogen first isolated from termites (Nasutitermes nigriceps). Its cells are strictly anaerobic, Gram-negative, endospore-forming, straight to slightly curved rods (0.5–0.8×2–8 μm) that are motile by means of lateral flagella.

References

Further reading

External links 
LPSN

Type strain of Sporomusa termitida at BacDive -  the Bacterial Diversity Metadatabase

Veillonellaceae
Bacteria described in 1990